in Greece, the United Independent Left Movement (Greek: Ενιαία Ανεξάρτητη Αριστερή Κίνηση (ΕΑΑΚ), EAAK) is a sum of left-wing student organisations, active in 3rd-level educational institutions (Universities and Technological Educational Institutes).

Organisation 
EAAK consists of several schemas (special term to define an independent, direct democratic collectiveness). Each EAAK schema has a relevant independence of organisation, political decision-making and activity. All schemas co-ordinate in a regularly organised co-ordinating assembly (twice a year), while local gatherings take place time by time.

A basic political choice of a schema, which separates it from a political parties is the so-called non-representative structure of the schema as well as the importance of consensus when making decisions. More populated schemas might vote.

History 
The EAAK was founded in 1990–91, when a large group of Communist Youth of Greece members disagreed with its leadership and split, founding the New Left Current (NAR), which collaborated with ASF (Left Student Rally), a network of university schemas.

Currently, more than 10 radical left organisations participate in EAAK. Namely:

 Youth of Communist Liberation (n.K.A.)
 Left Recomposition (AR.AN)
 Left Anti-capitalist Group (AR.A.S.)
 Left Group (ARI.S.)
 Socialist Workers' Party (S.E.K.)
 Organization of Communist Internationalists of Greece-Spartacus
 Revolutionary Communist Movement of Greece (E.K.K.E.)
 Workers Revolutionary Party (E.E.K.)
 Communist Organization Redeployment
 Ergatiko Antimperialistiko Metopo (E.A.M.)

EAAK schemas, based on their independence, retain a level of political freedom from their political co-ordinates.

EAAK has played a major role in every youth movement since its creation. Its role was most prominent in the Greek student movement of 2006/2007, when over 400 university faculties in Greece were shut down by students, as a form of demonstration against the government, induced changes in educational laws (including constitutional reforms).

In 2016, EAAK collaborated with the left-wing student organisations AREN and ARDIN.

Politics, tactics 
Non-representative action: EAAK groups generally object to their representation in school administration councils. They participate collectively as a group in the administration council of each school and university. They also refuse to accept decision-making in the Committee Meetings of the student unions and generally disapprove of the administrative faculty councils, supporting the role of general assemblies.

United university degree for all students: One of the main disagreements with other left groups is their support of united  academic degrees. They disagree with knowledge specialisation and the split of university study objects. They also oppose to any commercial involvement of corporations within studies and academic research.

Massive action: EAAK demonstrate massive actions quite often; such as rallies, sit-ins, occupation of administration offices and/or entire school buildings.

References

Youth wings of communist parties
Youth wings of political parties in Greece